The High School Affiliated to Xi'an Jiaotong University (Simplified Chinese: 西安交通大学附属中学; traditional Chinese: 西安交通大學附屬中學) or HSXJTU, is an affiliated high school established in 1959 and rebuilt in 1981 in Xi'an, Shaanxi, China. Its predecessor is The Middle School Affiliated to Nanyang Public School which was established in Shanghai in 1896. In 1991, HSXJTU was awarded the title of the key high school of Xi'an and Shaanxi province. In December, 2008, it was chosen as the first batch of demonstration high school in Shaanxi. The school is located in the southeast of Xi'an, and its two different campuses are individually in Beilin District and Yanta District.

History 
 In 1896, famous Qing Dynasty scholar, Sheng Huaixuan, established the Nanyang Public School in Shanghai. Then he invited American educator John Calvin Ferguson to serve as the vice-chancellor in the second year. 
 In the spring of 1898, the Nanyang Public School established its own middle school, which was special due to its status and was managed by Wang Zhishan. He recruited new students from society.
 In 1909, the special middle school changed into common school which is also called "affiliated school". It was famous that time because its students are in high academic level. 
 In 1920, Nanyang Public School changed into Shanghai Jiaotong University. 
 In 1955, some university professors, teachers and students moved to Xi'an. Xi'an Jiaotong University was officially founded in 1959.
 In July, 1959, The High School Affiliated to Xi'an Jiaotong University was established. 
 In 1971, the high school was managed by Xi'an government and it changed name to "Xi'an No.38 Middle School". 
 In 1981, in order to inherit history, HSXJTU was rebuilt. 
 In 1991, HSXJTU was awarded the title of the key high school of Xi'an and Shaanxi province.
 In December, 2008, it was chosen as the first batch of demonstration high school in Shaanxi.

School Mission 
努力追求适合每一个学生发展的教育。

To help each student to discover their talents.

培养有涵养、有责任心、有创新能力、有领袖素养、有国际胸怀的品学体兼优的可持续发展人才。

We aim at Nurturing whole persons with inner grace, responsibility, creativity, leadership and international outlook.

References

Schools in Xi'an
High schools in Shaanxi
Educational institutions established in 1959
Xi'an Jiaotong University
1959 establishments in China